Zbigniew Zysk (25 April 1950 in Olsztyn – 4 November 2020 in Olsztyn) was a Polish politician.

Biography
He was a member of the Sejm from 1993 to 1997. 

Zysk died of COVID-19 in Olsztyn, at age 70, during the pandemic in Poland.

References

1950 births
2020 deaths
Polish People's Party politicians
Members of the Polish Sejm 1993–1997
Deaths from the COVID-19 pandemic in Poland